Sumeja Bektaš (born 12 November 1993) is a Bosnian footballer who plays as a defender for Premier League club SFK 2000 and the Bosnia and Herzegovina women's national team.

References

1993 births
Living people
Bosnia and Herzegovina women's footballers
Women's association football defenders
Bosnia and Herzegovina women's international footballers